Before is the opposite of after, and may refer to:

 Before (Gold Panda EP), 2009
 Before (James Blake EP), 2020
 "Before" (song), a 1996 song by the Pet Shop Boys
 "Before", a song by the Empire of the Sun from Two Vines
 "Before", a song by Anastacia from Evolution
 "Before" (short story) by Gael Baudino
 The Before film trilogy by Richard Linklater
 Before Sunrise, 1995
 Before Sunset, 2004
 Before Midnight (2013 film)

See also
Before Christ (BC), an epoch used in dating years prior to the estimated birth of Jesus
Before Common Era (BCE), an alternative naming of the traditional calendar era primarily used in academic circles
Before Present (BP), a timescale used mainly in geology